Noemí Escandell (1942–2019) was an Argentine postwar contemporary artist. Her abstract, geometric works on paper and wood were censored from 1968 through 1983. During the Juan Carlos Ongania dictatorship, she joined Rosario's Grupo de Arte Vanguardia, which organized the Tucumán arde protest.

Her work has been featured in several exhibitions in galleries and museums, including the Jewish Museum of New York and Henrique Faria, Buenos Aires.

References

Further reading 

 
 

1942 births
2019 deaths
Argentine artists
People from Rosario, Santa Fe
20th-century Argentine women artists
20th-century Argentine artists
21st-century Argentine women artists
21st-century Argentine artists